William Marshall "Big Bill" Hollenback (February 22, 1886 – March 12, 1968) was an American football player and coach.  He played football at the University of Pennsylvania, where he was selected as an All-American fullback three straight years, from 1906 to 1908.  Hollenback served as the head football coach at Pennsylvania State University (1909, 1911–1914), the University of Missouri (1910), Pennsylvania Military College, now Widener University (1912, 1915), and Syracuse University (1916), compiling a career college football record of 46–19–8.  He was inducted into the College Football Hall of Fame as a player in 1951.

Early life and playing career
Born in Blue Bell, Pennsylvania, Hollenback attended Phillipsburg High School. As an undergraduate at the University of Pennsylvania from 1904 to 1908, he became one of the school's most renowned football players. He played end in 1904. He was unable to play during the 1905 season due to a broken leg. After returning from the injury, Hollenback was moved to the fullback, a position he played from 1906 to 1908. He was selected as an All-American fullback in each of those years. As a senior in 1908, Holleback was the captain of the undefeated Penn team that was named national champion. Jim Thorpe, whose Carlisle Indians team played Penn to a 6–6 tie in 1908, called Hollenback his "greatest and toughest opponent." In 1921, Hollenback played professional football for the Union Quakers of Philadelphia alongside future Philadelphia Eagles founder, co-owner and coach, Bert Bell. In 1925, Hollenback served as the referee for the Pottsville Maroons' 9–7 victory over the Notre Dame All-Stars, featuring the legendary Four Horsemen, at Shibe Park. The game resulted in a controversy that stripped the Maroons of their 1925 NFL championship

Coaching career
Hollenback received a degree in dentistry, but opted to become a football coach after graduating from Penn. He served as the head football coach at Penn State (1909, 1911–1914), the University of Missouri (1910), Pennsylvania Military College (1915) and Syracuse University (1916). During his tenure, he compiled a 28–9–4 (.732) record.

Business and politics
Hollenback served briefly as the president of the Bird Coal Company in 1914. He also owned the William M. Hollenback Coal Company. He was also active in politics, and served on the Philadelphia City Council from 1940 to 1944.

Family and death
Hollenback married Marion Cressman in 1917. They had one child, William M. Hollenback, Jr.  His older brother, Jack Hollenback, was also a head football coach at Penn State. Hollenback died on March 12, 1968, at Bryn Mawr Convalescent Center in Bryn Mawr, Pennsylvania.

Head coaching record

See also
 List of college football head coaches with non-consecutive tenure

References

External links
 

1886 births
1968 deaths
19th-century players of American football
20th-century American politicians
American football ends
American football fullbacks
American football officials
Missouri Tigers football coaches
Penn Quakers football coaches
Penn Quakers football players
Penn State Nittany Lions football coaches
Syracuse Orange football coaches
Union Quakers of Philadelphia players
Widener Pride football coaches
Philadelphia City Council members
University of Missouri faculty
All-American college football players
College Football Hall of Fame inductees
People from Whitpain Township, Pennsylvania
Coaches of American football from Pennsylvania
Players of American football from Pennsylvania